William Dill Rogers (May 12, 1927 in Wilmington, Delaware – September 22, 2007 in Upperville, Virginia) was an American lawyer. He served as U.S. Assistant Secretary of State for Inter-American Affairs (October 1974 – June 1976) and Undersecretary of State for Economic Affairs (June 1976–January 1977) under then-Secretary of State Henry Kissinger in the administration of President Gerald Ford. He was amongst the founding members in 1982, and from 2004 until his death was vice chairman, of Kissinger's consulting firm Kissinger Associates.

In the 1950s, Rogers joined the law firm of Arnold, Fortas, & Porter (now Arnold & Porter) and was involved in the successful legal defense of Owen Lattimore, the scholar of East Asia accused of being a key Soviet spy.

Personal
Rogers was no relation to President Richard M. Nixon's Secretary of State William P. Rogers.

Rogers majored in international affairs at Princeton University and graduated from Yale Law School in 1951.

He died in Upperville, Virginia, on September 22, 2007, at the age of 80.
Rogers was survived by his wife of 56 years, Suzanne Rochford "Suki" Rogers, two sons, Dr. William D. Rogers Jr. and Daniel R. Rogers, a sister, and four grandchildren.

Selected publications
 Charles E. Clark, William D. Rogers, "The New Judiciary Act of Puerto Rico: A Definitive Court Reorganization", 61 Yale Law Journal,  1147, No. 7, Nov. 1952.
 William D. Rogers, (1967) The Twilight Struggle: The Alliance for Progress and the Politics of Development in Latin America, New York: Random House.
 William D. Rogers, "United States Investment in Latin America: A Critical Appraisal, 11 Virginia Journal of International Law 246 (1970-71).
 William D. Rogers, "The Constitutionality of the Cambodian Incursion", American Journal of International Law, vol. 65, No. 1, Jan. 1971, at 26, at JSTOR database. 
 William D. Rogers, "Of Missionaries, Fanatics, and Lawyers: Some Thoughts on Investment Disputes in the Americas", American Journal of International Law, vol. 72,  No. 1,  (Jan. 1978), at 1-16. at JSTOR database
 William D. Rogers, "The United States and Latin America", Foreign Affairs, vol. 63, No. 3, 1984, at 560-80.
 Louis Henkin, Michael J. Glennon, William D. Rogers eds., (1990) Foreign Affairs and the U.S. Constitution, Irvington on Hudson, New York: Transnational Publishers.
 William D. Rogers, ""Power" to "Law": It's Not as Bad as All That", 23 Wisconsin International Law Journal, 1, at 39-47.
 William D. Rogers, "Fleeing the Chilean Coup: The Debate of U.S. Complicity", International Affairs, Jan.-Feb. 2004.
  William D. Rogers, "Why Keep a Lonely Stance on Cuba?", Los Angeles Times,  Nov. 13, 1998.

See also 
 List of law clerks of the Supreme Court of the United States (Seat 6)

Notes

References

 
 Obituary in The Times, 22 October 2007
 Maxwell, Kenneth, "The Case of the Missing Letter in Foreign Affairs: Kissinger, Pinochet and Operation Condor", Working Papers on Latin America, David Rockefeller Center for Latin American Studies, No. 04/05-3 ©2004. New link 2010-04-19.
Kissinger blocked demarche on international assassinations to Condor states: Rescinded orders to warn military regimes days before Letelier bombing in Washington, DC: Overruled Aides who wanted to 'head off' a 'series of international murders'", Peter Kornbluh, ed., National Security Archive Electronic Briefing Book No. 312, posted April 10, 2010. Retrieved via The New York Times 2010-04-19.
"Legends in the Law", a 1999 interview with Rogers originally published in Bar Report, October/November 1999, published by the Washington, DC bar association, includes considerable biographical material.
 
 Henry A. Kissinger, "Henry Kissinger says Goodbye to the Man He Calls "My Conscience"", Foreign Policy, Oct. 12, 2007. at http://www.henryakissinger.com/
"Memorandum to Congress on the ICC From Current and Past Presidents of the ASIL", American Journal of International Law,  vol. 95,  2001, at 967-9.

External links 

 

1927 births
2007 deaths
People from Wilmington, Delaware
Law clerks of the Supreme Court of the United States
Princeton University alumni
Yale Law School alumni
United States Assistant Secretaries of State
Arnold & Porter people
Presidents of the American Society of International Law